Vulimeswaram is a south Indian village in Peddapuram Mandal in East Godavari District of Andhra Pradesh.

References

Villages in East Godavari district